Zangba is a sub-prefecture of Basse-Kotto in the Central African Republic.

Geography 
The locality is located on the right bank of the Ubangi River which is the border with Congo DRC.

History 

As of May 2021 Zangba remains under control of Union for Peace in the Central African Republic rebel group.

Administration 
The sub-prefecture of Zangba is made up of the two communes of Ouambé and Yabongo.

References 

Sub-prefectures of the Central African Republic
Populated places in the Central African Republic